Ward V. Evans (1880 - 1957) was a chemist who served as a professor at Northwestern University and Loyola University Chicago. He was known as one of three members of the commission which revoked the security clearance of J. Robert Oppenheimer. Evans was the only member who voted to allow Oppenheimer to retain his security clearance, stating that failure to clear Oppenheimer would be "a black mark on the escutcheon of our country.".

Biography
Evans was born in Rawlinsville, Pennsylvania, on June 6, 1880, the son of Jacob Evans, a farmer, and Elizabeth (Oldham) Evans.
He received a teaching certificate at Millersville State Teachers College, a B.A. at Franklin and Marshall College (1907), and a Ph.D. at Columbia University (1916). In 1916 he joined the faculty of Northwestern University as an instructor in chemistry. During the first world war, Evans spent a year in the army, where he was involved in testing explosives at Catholic University and the Pittsburgh Bureau of Mines. Evans then returned to Northwestern in 1918, where he remained until 1945, becoming department chair in 1942. In 1947 he joined the chemistry department at Loyola University Chicago, retiring as chair in 1951.

For more than 20 years, Evans served on the national council of the American Chemical Society, and in 1946 received an Honor Scroll from the American Institute of Chemists. An authority on explosions, Evans served as a consultant as well as expert witness on lawsuits related to explosions.

In 1954 Evans served as one of three panel members at the security clearance hearing of J. Robert Oppenheimer. He was the only member who voted to allow Oppenheimer to retain his security clearance.

Evans died on 2 August 1957, at Lancaster General Hospital. He had suffered a stroke at his summer home in Fishing Creek.

Security clearance hearing
Wolverton wrote that

References

1880 births
1957 deaths
McCarthyism
Northwestern University faculty
Loyola University Chicago faculty